Li Shiming (born December 1948) is a retired general (shang jiang) of the People's Liberation Army (PLA) of China. He served as commander of the Chengdu Military Region.

Biography
Born in Santai County, Sichuan Province, he joined the PLA in April 1968, and the Communist Party of China in December of the same year. In December 2006, he was appointed vice commander of the PLA Chengdu Military Region. In September 2007, he was promoted to commander of the Chengdu Military Region. He retired in 2013 and Li Zuocheng succeeded him as commander of the Chengdu MR.

He attained the rank of lieutenant general in 2005, promoted to general in 2011, and was a full member of the 17th Central Committee of the Communist Party of China (2007−12).

References

1948 births
Living people
People's Liberation Army generals from Sichuan
People from Mianyang